Peter Crève (born 17 August 1961) is a retired Belgium footballer who played as a midfielder.

External links

 

1961 births
Living people
Belgian footballers
Association football midfielders
K.S.K. Beveren players
Club Brugge KV players
Belgium international footballers